The twenty-fourth season of the Case Closed anime was directed by Yasuichiro Yamamoto and produced by TMS Entertainment and Yomiuri Telecasting Corporation. The series is based on Gosho Aoyama's Case Closed manga series. In Japan, the series is titled  but was changed due to legal issues with the title Detective Conan. The series focuses on the adventures of teenage detective Shinichi Kudo who was turned into a child by a poison called APTX 4869, but continues working as a detective under the alias Conan Edogawa.

The episodes use seven pieces of theme music: four openings and three endings. The first opening is "Butterfly Core" by Valshe for episodes 740-743. the second opening theme is "Greed" by Knock Out Monkey used from episode 744 until episode 756. The third opening is "DYNAMITE" by Mai Kuraki and was used until episode 773. The fourth opening is "WE GO" by BREAKERZ, starting from episode 774. The first ending theme is "Rain Man" by Akihide used for episodes 740-749.

The season began airing on May 31, 2014 through May 16, 2015 on Nippon Television Network System in Japan. The season was later collected and released in ten DVD compilations by Shogakukan between January 22, 2016 and November 25, 2016, in Japan. Crunchyroll began simulcasting the series in October 2014, starting with episode 754.



Episode list

References

Notes
 The episodes were aired as a single hour-long episode in Japan

References

Season24
2014 Japanese television seasons
2015 Japanese television seasons